Kashmarz (also Romanized as Keshmarz; also known as Kacha Marz and Kashmarz-e Afshārīyeh) is a village in Afshariyeh Rural District, Khorramdasht District, Takestan County, Qazvin Province, Iran. At the 2006 census, its population was 393, in 86 families.

References 

Populated places in Takestan County